Pinetta is an unincorporated community in Madison County, Florida, United States. Pinetta has a post office with ZIP code 32350, which opened on May 4, 1891.

Education

Pinetta Elementary School is a part of the District School Board of Madison County. Secondary school students go to the PreK-8 Madison County Central School, which serves Pinetta students for middle school, and Madison County High School.

References

Unincorporated communities in Madison County, Florida
Unincorporated communities in Florida